This is a list of members of the Belgian Chamber of Representatives during the 53rd legislature (2010–2014), arranged alphabetically.

Election results (13 June 2010)

Bureau

Presidents

College of Quaestors

Floor leaders

List of representatives

By electoral district

Dutch- and French-speaking

Brussels-Halle-Vilvoorde (22)

Dutch-speaking

Antwerp (24)

Leuven (7)

Limburg (12)

East Flanders (20)

West Flanders (16)

French-speaking

Hainaut (19)

Liège (15)

Luxembourg (4)

Namur (6)

Walloon Brabant (5)

By party

Dutch-speaking

New Flemish Alliance (27)

Christian Democratic and Flemish (17)

Socialist Party – Differently (13)

Open Flemish Liberals and Democrats (13)

Vlaams Belang (12)

Groen (5)

LDD (1)

French-speaking

Parti Socialiste (26)

Mouvement Réformateur (18)

cdH (9)

Ecolo (8)

Parti Populaire (1)

List of representatives who chose not to sit

List of representatives who resigned

Sources
 
 
 
 

Belgian Chamber of Representatives
2010s in Belgium